Vielmetter Los Angeles (formerly Susanne Vielmetter Los Angeles Projects) is a contemporary art gallery founded in 2000 by Susanne Vielmetter. The gallery is located in downtown Los Angeles.

History

Susanne Vielmetter launched her first gallery in 2000 on Wilshire Boulevard in Los Angeles, CA, before moving to a larger 7,500 square foot gallery in Culver City in 2010. In 2019, the gallery moved to its current 24,000 square foot location in downtown Los Angeles. Between 2007 and 2009, the gallery maintained a second branch in Germany, Susanne Vielmetter Berlin Projects. 

In an interview conducted in September 2018 by Audrey Rose Smith for The Armory Show, Susanne Vielmetter was described as "a stalwart of the Los Angeles art scene" and the gallery's roster of artists is regarded as “very balanced between male and female artists."

Artists

Artists represented by the gallery include:

 Edgar Arceneaux 
 My Barbarian
 Sadie Benning 
 Ellen Berkenblit
 Andrea Bowers 
 Kim Dingle
 Nicole Eisenman
 Genevieve Gaignard
 Nash Glynn
 Liz Glynn
 Karl Haendel
 Stanya Kahn
 Hayv Kahraman
 Shana Lutker
 Hugo McCloud
 Dave McKenzie
 Rodney McMillian
 Paul Mpagi Sepuya 
 Wangechi Mutu 
 Elizabeth Neel
 Ruben Ochoa
 Angel Otero
 Pope.L
 Mary Reid Kelley
 Amy Sillman
 Mickalene Thomas
 Tam Van Tran

References

External links

Art museums and galleries in Los Angeles
Contemporary art galleries in the United States
Buildings and structures in Culver City, California
Art galleries established in 2000
2000 establishments in California